Rudolf Kirchschläger, GColIH (20 March 1915 – 30 March 2000) was an Austrian diplomat, politician and judge. From 1974 to 1986, he served as President of Austria.

Early life and education
Born in Niederkappel, Upper Austria, Kirschläger was orphaned at the age of 11. He graduated from high school in Horn in 1935 with distinction and started to study law at the University of Vienna. However, after the Anschluss of Austria in 1938, he had to give up his studies. Upon refusing to join the NSDAP, his scholarship was revoked and Kirchschläger could not finance his studies any longer. Kirchschläger worked as a bank clerk in 1938 until he was drafted to service in the infantry of the Wehrmacht in the summer of 1939. Kirchschläger fought as a soldier from the very beginning of the war, first during the invasion of Poland, later on the Western Front, and after 1941 against Russia on the Eastern Front.

In late 1940, in order to get out of the military, he used a two-month front-leave to prepare for the final exam (Staatsexamen) of his law studies. Subsequently, he passed the exams and graduated to Doctor iuris.

However, he was sent back to the Eastern Front, where he was wounded in 1942. Towards the end of war, he was captain and training officer at the military academy at Wiener Neustadt in the Vienna region. In early April 1945, commanding a company of cadets fighting approaching Soviet troops, he was badly wounded on his leg, an injury from which he never fully recovered.

Post-World War II
After the war, Kirchschläger worked as a district judge until 1954 in Langenlois and later Vienna. In 1954, he got the chance to work in the Ministry of Foreign Affairs, although he did not speak any foreign languages. In order to take part in the negotiations on the Austrian State Treaty, he taught himself English in only a few months. From 1967 until 1970, he was ambassador in Prague. Despite orders not to do so, he issued exit visas to Czech citizens who tried to flee from the Communists during the Soviet invasion of Czechoslovakia. From 1970 to 1974 he was Minister of Foreign Affairs.

Presidency
Kirchschläger was elected President of Austria in 1974. In a programmatic lecture at Innsbruck University in February 1971 he outlined his understanding of an "ethical foreign policy". In 1974, he issued a pardon to convicted Austrian Nazi war criminal Franz Novak, who had coordinated the railroad deportation of European Jews to concentration and extermination camps.

In 1980, he was elected for a second term with an approval rate of 80%, the highest rate ever obtained in any presidential elections. In February 1984, he paid the first state visit of an Austrian president to the United States.

Personal life and death

He was married to Herma Sorger (1916–2009) from 17 August 1940 until his death; they had two children: Christa (born 1944) and Walter (born 1947).

Kirchschläger died of a heart attack on 30 March 2000 near Vienna, aged 85.

Honours

Austrian honours 
  Grand-Cross Order of Merit of the Austrian Republic, Austria (1974)

Foreign honours 

 Grand-Cross of the Order of Merit of the Italian Republic, Italy (1971)
 Knight of the Order of the Gold Lion of the House of Nassau, House of Nassau (1975)
 Knight of the Collar of the Order of Isabella the Catholic, Spain (1978)
 Knight of the Order of the Elephant, Denmark (1979)
 Knight of the Collar of the Order of Charles III, Spain (1979) 
 Grand Collar of the Order of Prince Henry, Portugal (1984)
 Grand-Cross of the Order of Pope Pius IX, Holy See (1990)
 First Class of the Order of Tomáš Garrigue Masaryk, Czech Republic (1996)
 Knight Grand Cross with Collar of Order of Pope Pius IX, Holy See (2000)

Literature
 Rudolf Kirchschläger, Der Friede beginnt im eigenen Haus. Gedanken über Österreich. Vienna: Molden (1980); 
 Rudolf Kirchschläger, Ethik und Außenpolitik Hans Köchler (ed.), Philosophie und Politik. Dokumentation eines interdisziplinären Seminars. Innsbruck: Arbeitsgemeinschaft für Wissenschaft und Politik, pp. 69–74 (1973)
 Alois Mock, Herbert Schambeck (Hrsg.): Verantwortung in unserer Zeit. Festschrift für Rudolf Kirchschläger. Österreichische Staatsdruckerei, 1990.
 Rabl, Erich: Rudolf Kirchschläger (1915-2000), Jurist, Diplomat, Außenminister und Bundespräsident. In: Harald Hitz, Franz Pötscher, Erich Rabl, Thomas Winkelbauer (Hg.): Waldviertler Biographien, Bd. 3, Horn (Waldviertler Heimatbund) 2010, S. 399–428. .
 Schenz, Marco: Bundespräsident Rudolf Kirchschläger. Böhlau-Verlag, Wien 1984.

References

1915 births
2000 deaths
Austrian Roman Catholics
Burials at the Vienna Central Cemetery
Foreign ministers of Austria
Politicians from Vienna
State Presidents of Austria
University of Vienna alumni
Ambassadors of Austria to the Czech Republic
Recipients of the Order of Tomáš Garrigue Masaryk
Recipients of the Grand Star of the Decoration for Services to the Republic of Austria
Commanders Crosses of the Order of Merit of the Federal Republic of Germany
Knights Grand Cross of the Order of Merit of the Italian Republic
Collars of the Order of Isabella the Catholic
Grand Collars of the Order of Prince Henry
Knights Grand Cross of the Order of Pope Pius IX
Austrian judges
Austrian diplomats